Juan David Valencia Hinestroza (born January 15, 1986) is a Colombian professional footballer who plays as a left back, although he can also play as a midfielder.

Club career
Valencia started his footballing career in the youth ranks of Independiente Medellín. After making his debut in the Colombian First Division with the Medellín club, Valencia was loaned out to Venezuelan side Caracas FC. Valencia quickly established himself as a fixture on the left side of the Caracas midfield. He has also played left back.

He scored his first league goal with Caracas in a 2-1 victory over rival Unión Atlético Maracaibo. He has also started all the club's matches in the 2008 Copa Libertadores, scoring in a 1-1 draw versus Brazilian side Cruzeiro Esporte Clube on March 18, 2008.

In 2012, Atlético Nacional bought the half of his rights after being champion of Liga Postobon with Atlético Junior.

Honours

Club
Flamengo
Categoría Primera A (2): 2004-I, 2009-II
Caracas FC
Venezuelan Primera División (1): 2006-07
Atlético Junior
Categoría Primera A (1): 2011-II
Atlético Nacional
Categoría Primera A (3): 2013-I, 2013-II, 2014-I
Copa Colombia (2): 2012, 2013
Superliga Colombiana (1): 2012

External links
 with Caracas FC
 career stats
 

1986 births
Living people
Footballers from Medellín
Colombian footballers
Colombia international footballers
Categoría Primera A players
Venezuelan Primera División players
Independiente Medellín footballers
Caracas FC players
Atlético Huila footballers
Atlético Junior footballers
Atlético Nacional footballers
Independiente Santa Fe footballers
Colombian expatriate footballers
Expatriate footballers in Venezuela
2011 Copa América players
Association football defenders